WJ may refer to:

 Jeep Grand Cherokee (WJ), a generation of Jeep Grand Cherokee
 Air Labrador, based in Canada (1948-2017, IATA code WJ)
 West Jersey Railroad, a predecessor of the West Jersey and Seashore Railroad
 WestJet airlines
 Wiking-Jugend, a German Neo-Nazi organization
 Woodcock–Johnson Tests of Cognitive Abilities, a set of intelligence tests
 Word joiner, a Unicode character
 Fighting World of Japan Pro Wrestling, also known as World Japan